Courant is a surname. Notable people with the surname include:

Charles Courant (1896–1982), Swiss sport wrestler
Curt Courant (1899–1968), German cinematographer
Ernest Courant (1920–2020), American physicist
Frédéric Courant, French journalist
Paul Courant, American economist
Pierre Courant (1897–1965), French politician
Richard Courant (1888–1972), German American mathematician
Theodore James Courant, American mathematician